Ronald "Killer" Koes (August 6, 1937 – November 30, 2014) was a Canadian football player who played for the Saskatchewan Roughriders and Ottawa Rough Riders. He won the Grey Cup with them in 1960. Before he went into the CFL, he was drafted into the NFL with the chargers and lions.  He played college football for the University of North Carolina at Chapel Hill. Koes died at the age of 77 in 2014.

References

1938 births
Players of American football from Pennsylvania 
Saskatchewan Roughriders players
Ottawa Rough Riders players
2014 deaths